Herbert Orval Sparrow,  (January 4, 1930 – September 6, 2012) was a Canadian politician.

At the time of his retirement, Sparrow was the longest-serving member of the Senate of Canada, and was the last remaining member of the Upper House to have been appointed by Prime Minister Lester Pearson. He was appointed on February 9, 1968, and sat as a member of the Liberal Party of Canada representing the province of Saskatchewan. Sparrow retired from the Senate upon reaching the mandatory retirement age of 75 on January 4, 2005.

Sparrow was a businessman, farmer and rancher.  He opened one of the first Canadian KFC locations in North Battleford, Saskatchewan in the 1950s and still operated the establishment until his death.

Sparrow was involved in many worthwhile projects in the city of North Battleford.  His contracting company "Westman Contracting LTD" helped develop many parts of the Killdeer area in North Battleford.  He also provided lunches to underprivileged children at local schools and helped form the Centennial School for special-need children.

In 2008, he was made a Member of the Order of Canada.

Sparrow was in excellent health despite his advanced age until 2012 when he had a massive stroke and had to be transferred to RUH in Saskatoon where he died less than a week later.

References

External links
 

1930 births
2012 deaths
Canadian senators from Saskatchewan
Liberal Party of Canada senators
Members of the Order of Canada
Politicians from Saskatoon
21st-century Canadian politicians